Vikatakavi is a 1984 Malayalam film, written and directed by Hariharan. It stars Prem Nazir, Madhavi and Mammootty in the lead roles. The film's music has been composed by Devarajan, with lyrics by P. Bhaskaran.

Cast
 Prem Nazir as Sankunni Nair
 Madhavi as Santhi
 Mammootty as Usman 
 Balan K. Nair
 T. G. Ravi as Krishnankutty/ K. K. Nair 
 Swapna as Sudha
 Sukumari as Ayisha
 Kuthiravattam Pappu as Adruman
 Bahadoor as Avaran
 Vanitha Krishnachandran as Nabeesa
 Rajkumar Sethupathi as Sasi 
Aranmula Ponnamma as Sankunni's mother
Pattom Sadan as Lohithakshan
Lalithasree as Lalitha
Janardhanan as Mahesh
Vincent as S. P. Ramesh
 Sadhana as Mrs. Nair
Radhamani as Narayani

Soundtrack
The music was composed by G. Devarajan and the lyrics were written by P. Bhaskaran.

References

External links
 
 Vikatakavi at the Malayalam Movie Database

1984 films
1980s Malayalam-language films
Films directed by Hariharan